Shanklin Chine is a geological feature and tourist attraction in the town of Shanklin, on the Isle of Wight, England. A wooded coastal ravine, it contains waterfalls, trees and lush vegetation, with footpaths and walkways allowing paid access for visitors, and a heritage centre explaining its history.

Geology

A chine is a local word for a stream cutting back into a soft cliff. Formation of the Chine, which cuts through Lower Greensand Cretaceous sandstones, has taken place over the last 10,000 years. In the latter half of the nineteenth century, stones were laid at the top of the waterfall to arrest this progress. There are a continuous series of spring lines on the cliff faces in the Chine. The Isle of Wight has a number of chines, but the largest remaining is Shanklin. With a drop of 32 m (105 ft) to sea level, and a length of just over 400m (a quarter of a mile), the Chine covers an area of approximately 1.2 hectares (three acres).

History
Prior to the Victorian era Shanklin was merely a small agricultural and fishing community, the latter nestling at the foot of the chine, and it was not until the early 19th century that it began to grow. Like most of the chines on the south of the Island, Shanklin Chine was well-used by smugglers.

A romantic landscape

The Chine became one of the earliest tourist attractions on the Isle of Wight, with records of the public visiting the site to view it as far back as 1817. Keats found inspiration for some of his greatest poetry while staying at Shanklin in 1819 and wrote: "The wondrous Chine here is a very great Lion; I wish I had as many guineas as there have been spy-glasses in it." It was a favourite subject for artists including Thomas Rowlandson and Samuel Howitt. Descriptions of the site at the time are surprisingly similar to the present day:

'The delightful village of Shanklin. In this sequestered spot is a good inn, fitted up for the accommodation of visitors. The  object of attraction at Shanklin is the Chine, (which is situated at about ten minutes walk from the inn. This phenomenon of nature is a combination of beauty and grandeur; it is formed by the separation of a lofty cliff, whose height is 280 feet perpendicular, and 100 feet wide at the top. On entering the Chine from the shore, we pass along one side, rugged and barren; through which a winding path has been cut by a poor fisherman; while below the rippling stream urges its way to the ocean, which pours its rolling waters at its feet, and spreads its boundless expanse before it. On the other side the cliff is fertile, covered with hanging wood and bushes, adorned with a neat cottage, and having a little rustic inn. About the middle of the Chine is a small Chalybeate: and the path now conducts by a serpentine course to a scene of awful grandeur, formed by stupendous masses of matter on each side, and the rustling of a small cascade, which falls from the head of the Chine, and passes between the dark and overhanging cliffs.

Extract from Beauties of the Isle of Wight published by S Horsley 1828

Second World War
During the Second World War the Chine was taken over and used as an assault course by the Commandos whose HQ was at Upper Chine School. 40 Royal Marine Commando trained there in preparation for the Dieppe Raid in 1942. A fuel pipeline for Operation Pluto (Pipeline under the Ocean) also ran through the Chine.  of pipework has been preserved at the Chine, and is kept in situ for the public to view.

PLUTO, one of the great secret successes of the war, was the idea of Lord Louis Mountbatten who later became governor of the Isle of Wight. During the Normandy invasion in 1944, forked pipelines from the Chine and Sandown carried petrol  under the Channel to Cherbourg.

References

External links
Shanklin Chine official website

Chines of the Isle of Wight
Chine